Glyceraldehyde (glyceral) is a triose monosaccharide with chemical formula C3H6O3. It is the simplest of all common aldoses. It is a sweet, colorless, crystalline solid that is an intermediate compound in carbohydrate metabolism. The word comes from combining glycerol and aldehyde, as glyceraldehyde is glycerol with one alcohol group oxidized to an aldehyde.

Structure 

Glyceraldehyde has one chiral center and therefore exists as two different enantiomers with opposite optical rotation:

 In the R/S nomenclature, either R from Latin Rectus meaning "right", or S from Latin Sinister meaning "left"

While the optical rotation of glyceraldehyde is (+) for R and (−) for S, this is not true for all monosaccharides. The stereochemical configuration can only be determined from the chemical structure, whereas the optical rotation can only be determined empirically (by experiment).

It was by a lucky guess that the molecular  geometry was assigned to (+)-glyceraldehyde in the late 19th century, as confirmed by X-ray crystallography in 1951.

Nomenclature 
In the  system, glyceraldehyde is used as the configurational standard for carbohydrates. Monosaccharides with an absolute configuration identical to (R)-glyceraldehyde at the last stereocentre, for example C5 in glucose, are assigned the stereo-descriptor .

Chemical synthesis 
Glyceraldehyde can be prepared, along with dihydroxyacetone, by the mild oxidation of glycerol, for example with hydrogen peroxide and a ferrous salt as catalyst. 

Its cyclohexylidene acetal can also be produced by oxidative cleavage of the bis(acetal) of mannitol.

Biochemistry 
The enzyme glycerol dehydrogenase (NADP+) has two substrates, glycerol and NADP+, and 3 products, D-glyceraldehyde, NADPH and H+.

The interconversion of the phosphates of glyceraldehyde (glyceraldehyde 3-phosphate) and dihydroxyacetone (dihydroxyacetone phosphate), catalyzed by the enzyme triosephosphate isomerase, is a intermediate step in glycolysis.

See also 
 Stereoisomerism

References

Vicinal diols
Trioses